"Will the Wolf Survive?" is a single by American Chicano rock band Los Lobos. It was released in 1984 as the second single from their album How Will the Wolf Survive? The track was recorded with a drum machine.

Reception
The song reached number 26 on the Billboard Top Rock Tracks chart and number 78 on the Billboard Hot 100.

Cash Box said that the song is "features beautiful high harmonies on the chorus from John Hiatt as well as a melodically rich guitar lead from Cesar Rosas."

Waylon Jennings version

"Will the Wolf Survive?" was also recorded by American country music artist Waylon Jennings.  It was released in May 1986 as the second single and title track from the album Will the Wolf Survive?.  The song reached number 5 on the Billboard Hot Country Singles & Tracks chart.

Chart performance

References

1984 singles
1986 singles
Los Lobos songs
Waylon Jennings songs
Song recordings produced by Jimmy Bowen
Warner Records singles
MCA Records singles
Song recordings produced by T Bone Burnett
1984 songs